David Wiley Anderson (August 20, 1864 in Louisa, Virginia – April 7, 1940 in Scottsville, Virginia) was an American architect based in Richmond, Virginia.  He was well known in Virginia for his residential, commercial and institutional designs.   A number of his works are listed on the U.S. National Register of Historic Places.

Works include (with attribution):
 Benswanger House, 2230 Monument Ave. Richmond, VA (Anderson, D. Wiley), NRHP-listed
Boxley Place, 103 Ellisville Dr. Louisa, VA (Anderson, D. Wiley), NRHP-listed
Ednam House, US 250 Ednam, VA (Anderson, D. Wiley), NRHP-listed
Hermitage Road Historic District, 3800-4200 blocks of Hermitage Rd. Richmond, VA (Anderson, D. Wiley), NRHP-listed
Louisa County Courthouse, Jct. of Main St. and VA 208 Louisa, VA (Anderson, D. Wiley), NRHP-listed
Miller School of Albemarle, SE of Yancey Mills off VA 635 Yancey Mills, VA (Anderson, D. Wiley), NRHP-listed
Oakwood--Chimborazo Historic District, Roughly N 30th-N 39th St., Chimborazo, Meldon, Oakwood, E Broad, Briel, E Clay, E Leigh, M, E Marshall, N, O, and P Richmond, VA (Anderson, D. Wiley), NRHP-listed
Rivanna Farm, Rte. 1, Bremo Bluff, VA (Anderson, D. Wiley), NRHP-listed
One or more works in Union Hill Historic District, roughly 20th, 21st, 22nd, 23rd, 24th 25th, Jessamine, Pink, Burton, Carrington, Cedar, Clay, Jefferson, Leigh, M, O, Sts Richmond, VA (Anderson, D. Wiley), NRHP-listed

References

19th-century American architects
20th-century American architects
Architects from Richmond, Virginia
1864 births
1941 deaths
People from Louisa, Virginia
People from Scottsville, Virginia